The Pension, Disability and Carers Service was an executive agency of the Department for Work and Pensions (DWP) which was created in April 2008.

The PDCS brought together two former separate executive agencies, The Pension Service and the Disability and Carers Service. These two agencies kept their corporate branding and provided services under their separate identities. The two agencies shared roughly fifty percent of the same customers  and the rationalisation of services was believed to be likely to provide a better service.

Its status as an executive agency was removed on 1 October 2011 with its functions being brought back inside the DWP.

Further reading

Whitfield,G; Waring, A; Goode, J; Phung, V and Sutton, L (2011) 'Customers’ experiences of contact with the Pension, Disability and Carers Service' https://www.gov.uk/government/uploads/system/uploads/attachment_data/file/214497/rrep722.pdf

References

Defunct executive agencies of the United Kingdom government
Department for Work and Pensions
Organisations based in Leeds
Pensions in the United Kingdom
2008 establishments in the United Kingdom